Lakshmi Misthan Bhandar Hotel, popularly known as just LMB, is a well-known hotel, restaurant and sweet shop in Jaipur city in Rajasthan state in India. Established in 1727, it is located in downtown Jaipur in Johari Bazar. The hotel is said to be the first three star hotel of the state. Today, it is most known for its restaurant and mithai shop (sweet shop), which are a popular tourist attraction, serving traditional sweets like paneer ghewar, and the sweet lassi, apart from snacks, like samosa, chaat and Aloo tikki.

History
In 1727, when by Maharaja Sawai Jai Singh II, the ruler of Amber, founded the new capital city of Jaipur, he invited traders and artists from nearby towns to the newly built city, amongst them were a group of halwais, who set up a small sweet shop in Johri Bazaar. Years later in around, 1949/1950, one of the descendants of these halwais, Maliram Ghodawat, branded this sweet shop, as the Lakshmi Mishthan Bhandar (LMB). The hotel was added later on in 1954.

LMB is famous for its restaurant and sweetshop on the street-level, while the hotel stands above them. The restaurant serves pure vegetarian food and is known for its Rajasthani thali, Dal bati churma, and kulfi.

During the 2008 serial bomb blasts, which rocked the city, one of blasts took place near the restaurant.

Notes

References

External links
 LMB Hotel website

Hotels in Jaipur
Restaurants in India
Hotels established in 1954
Hotel buildings completed in 1954
Tourist attractions in Jaipur
Buildings and structures in Jaipur
1954 establishments in Rajasthan
20th-century architecture in India